is a single volume fantasy manga made by ex-CLAMP member Tamayo Akiyama. It was first published in Japan by Kadokawa Shoten in September 2000. In North America, it was licensed by Tokyopop, which released it on August 8, 2006.

Story
Zyword is an unbalanced dimensional structure held by three connection spells called Dawn, Deep, and Omega. Since these spells are unstable, Zyword is vulnerable to complete chaos. That's exactly what happens when the three Goddesses of Zyword betray its citizens and cast them under a spell that could cause them all to die in an eternal sleep.

Lunatia Araimel, a 14-year-old spell decipherer, and her 15-year-old friend, Roddy Lederide are the only ones that are able to escape from Araimel as the spell locks everyone in ice. Luna and Roddy meet up with a messenger named Zera, who came to the silent sector of Araimel to see what had happened.  Not too long after, Luna, Roddy, and Zera are in danger of being killed by monsters called spell-controlled soldiers. Luna is able to defeat the spell monsters, but then, right after, she learns the horrible truth about these monsters—they were just innocent human soldiers manipulated by magic. One of the three Goddesses, Arienna, had magically manipulated these soldiers in order to kill the saviors of Zyword. All of the humans inside the monsters are violently attacked and killed by the forces of magic—except for one, who happens to be a teenage boy with thousands of spells encrypted on his body.

Luna and Roddy keep watch over the boy until he dies—but then the boy awakens when Roddy is under attack and fights of Roddy's attackers.  It is revealed early in the story that Luna has been granted the Goddesses' Blessing. Little does Luna know that this blessing is actually also a curse put upon her since she was just a child.  Luna remembers her childhood love, a young man named Deke Diranoia, and swears that she will rescue him from the curse. However, will these tenacious teenage spell casters be able to free all who have been ensnared by the Goddesses' curse or will Zyword just plunge into doom?

Characters
Lunatia Araimel

A 14-year-old spell caster. She is the heroine of the story and is determined to fight for the future of Zyword. Luna is confident and strongheaded, and she swears her loyalty to Deke Diranoia. When Luna was five years old, she was "blessed" by the Goddesses...but after experiencing a nightmare, in which a young spell-infected boy was being quarantined (and was hated by the Goddesses), Luna has extreme hatred towards the Goddesses.

Roddy Lederide

Luna's childhood friend. Also a spell decipherer, he ventures away from Araimel with Luna to fight against the Goddesses. Roddy acts a lot like an older brother to Luna, especially when she tries to be overbearing on Ride.

Ride

The teenage boy who survived death after being trapped in a spell-controlled soldier. The effects of being manipulated and attacked have left him with amnesia. Since he can't even remember his own name, Luna gives him the pseudonym "Ride" after her long-lost friend. His real name is unknown. Ride is dark and moody, usually being very quiet and keeping to himself, as well as distancing himself from Roddy and Luna. After re-awakening from death, he dresses up like a Valstoke assassin, wearing a dark green uniform with armor, and bearing two large battle swords to kill off enemies. Luna and Roddy don't know it, but Ride has unique, and not to mention highly unknown high-level spell techniques that he uses to dissolve spells and fight enemies. Ride's body is encrypted with 70,000 spells. Each spell is to kill him, but they were all miraculously dissolved by the Queen of Araimel. Nobody knows it, but all the spells encrypted on Ride's body are all inactive. Sometimes, Luna tries to be overbearing on Ride, but she is just making sure that he stays safe until he regains his memory. Roddy learns how attached Luna feels to Ride, but convinces her to give him a break. The strange thing that Luna finds about Ride is that she's sure she's met him before long ago, but she doesn't know when or where. Another strange thing about him is that he may be linked to Deke...

Deke

Luna's childhood love. He is very kind and sincere, and he was also five-year-old Luna's teacher; he taught her how to use spells. After vomiting blood after a battle with a spell monster, he explains to Luna the reason for his condition; when he was twelve years old, he was cursed with a spell that was slowly killing him. He was being quarantined so that he wouldn't infect others with the deadly spell that he was carrying. At age three, Luna came across him and removed the spell...but even if it's been removed, the evil may have stayed in his body, and may continue to kill him over time.

The King of Araimel

Luna's father and the superior of all of Araimel.

Arienna

The Goddess of Chaos. She manipulated the soldiers of Valstoke and turned them against Luna, Roddy, and Zera.

Shervia

The Goddess of Blue. Later in the story, she ambushed Roddy and was on the verge of casting a manipulative spell on him. A very long time ago, when Luna was young, Shervia had beheaded the Queen of the Fairy World. Witnessing this, Luna was frightened, but Shervia told her to promise to keep it a secret.

Queen of the Fairy World

Superior of the fourth dimension aka the fairy world. When Luna was young, the Queen gave her the egg of a fairy beast. Luna was told to take care of this creature, as it would protect her against the Goddesses.

Ride's Trakcer

This is an extremely mysterious man who's after Ride. The reason is that he's out to kill Ride. Apparently, he wants to make sure Ride is dead, seeing that Ride was tainted with a deadly spell when he was young. But no matter what, Ride just won't die.

Locations

Araimel

One of the three greatest sectors in Zyword, and Luna's homeplace.

Diranoia

Another of the three greatest sectors in Zyword, and Deke's (and possibly Ride's) birthplace.

Baldo

One of the other sectors mentioned. Extremely little is known about it.

The Fourth Dimension

Best known as the Fairy World. This is where Luna met Shervia. This is also where the fairies live.

Valstoke

This place is the head of all of Zyword and is filled with protective Valstoke soldiers and deadly Valstoke assassins. This is where the Goddesses hold their positions.

Luna's Blessing
Luna received this blessing when she was five years old. During this ritual, she was forced to drink the Goddesses' blood. Everyone says she's lucky to receive this blessing, but Luna says the exact opposite. Luna feels pure hatred towards the Goddesses, despite the fact that the Goddesses like everything about her. Luna doesn't know that her blessing is also a curse.

Luna's Dream
Five-year-old Luna has a dream/flashback of when she was three years old. Luna was in a dark, creepy place with many enslaved people in chains. Luna is shocked to see a preteen boy in chains, guided by a tall mysterious man. Luna's mother describes to her that the Goddesses hate tainted blood, so all these people—including the young boy—are being quarantined. The boy was prepared to die alone, but then Luna removes the spell that is infecting him. The reason for the boy being in chains is why Luna hates the Goddesses.

Spell Controlled Soldiers
Arienna had placed innocent Valstoke soldiers under many horrible spells. Each soldier then has thousands of deadly spells encrypted on their bodies, invading their bodies and causing them to have evil powers. Each innocent soldier, now turned into an enemy, is encased in an enormous, monstrous being. These monsters can absorb spells, and when that happens, they can transform into deadlier beings.

Spells
There are thousands and thousands of spells in the world of Zyword, but many of them are unknown. Still, here's a few spells from the manga that the characters use.

Red Flame

Blue Aqua

Yellow Holy Beast

Green Kerberos

Red Thunder

There's also a spell that Arienna attempts to use, known as the Legendary Gold Spell. There are also manipulative spells that the Goddesses usually use to inflict upon innocent victims, much like they did with the spell-controlled soldiers. The spells in this manga are those of popular RPGs.

References

Further reading

External links

Adventure anime and manga
Fantasy anime and manga
Shōjo manga
Tamayo Akiyama
Tokyopop titles
2000 manga
Kadokawa Shoten manga